DEVO Live: The Mongoloid Years is a live album consisting of recordings from three early performances by American new wave band Devo, released by Rykodisc in 1992.

Overview
The album presents parts of three Devo concerts from their early days, presented in reverse chronological order: Max's Kansas City in November 1977 (mislabeled as May 1977), the Crypt in Akron in December 1976, and the WHK Auditorium in Cleveland on Halloween 1975. The concerts were recorded on four-track tape by the band, and the selections are described by Gerald Casale as "the best of the only audio tapes that escaped total disintegration over the last 15 years" in the liner notes.

The album includes an essay and description of the shows, penned by Casale, titled "The rest, as they say, is De-evolution." It describes both the environment of the shows and the development of the early band.

Max's Kansas City, NYC, November 1977
Tracks 1 through 9 are culled from this show. According to Casale, the day after the show, once arriving back in Akron, the band began to receive phone calls from record labels.

In 2014, Jackpot Records issued this set as a limited edition LP of 2000, Live at Max's Kansas City - November 15, 1977, including newly recovered audio of David Bowie introducing the set that night, and new liner notes by Casale.

The Crypt, Akron, December 1976
Tracks 10 through 13 stem from this set, a performance of Devo opening for the Dead Boys. Devo and Dead Boys fans began to clash in the audience, and the Dead Boys' Cheetah Chrome started a fight when Mark Mothersbaugh approached him during Devo's performance of "Jocko Homo". This was only the second Devo show to feature the five-man lineup that the band would continue with for the next ten years, including guitarist Bob Casale and drummer Alan Myers.

WHK Auditorium, Cleveland, Halloween 1975
The remainder of the disc is a very early Devo concert. The band had jokingly billed themselves as a cover band in order to garner a slot opening for Sun Ra at WHK-FM's annual Halloween party and appeared as four characters: Booji Boy (Mark Mothersbaugh), Clown (Bob Mothersbaugh), Jungle Jim (Jim Mothersbaugh) and Chinaman (Gerald Casale). This show featured the first ever performance of "Jocko Homo", during which Devo invited the audience to invade the stage, which resulted in them verbally threatening the band.

An alternative account of the evening states that the crowd became angry because Devo refused to stop playing and the headliner, Sun Ra, never got to perform. However, Casale states that the venue cleared out following Devo's set and that the band went on to watch Sun Ra's "incredible performance".

Track listing

Notes:
Track 11 is introduced with an uncredited performance of "Timing X". 
An introduction of the third show is mis-cued and added to the end of "Blockhead". 
Track 14 includes uncredited performances of "Baby Talkin' Bitches" and "Chango". 
The last two tracks on the album are also mis-cued and combine the performances of "Beulah", "Jocko Homo" and most of "I Need a Chick" onto one track.
The track labeled "I Need a Chick" features the band attempting to play further and being kicked off the stage.

Personnel 
Devo
 Mark Mothersbaugh – guitar (1–2), vocals (1–4, 6–9, 11, 13, 17), keyboards  
 Gerald V. Casale – vocals (5–6, 10, 12, 14, 16–17), bass guitar
 Bob Mothersbaugh – vocals (5–6), guitar
 Bob Casale – guitar, bass guitar (10), backing vocals (1–13)
 Alan Myers – drums (1–13)
 Jim Mothersbaugh – electronic percussion (14–17)

Technical
Gerald V. Casale – liner notes
Bruce Conner – cover photo, photography
Barbara Watson – rear card photo, photography
Ruby Ray – photography
Dr. Toby Mountain – mastering
Steve Jurgensmeyer – design

References

Devo live albums
1992 live albums
Rykodisc live albums